Antonio Diego Voci (VOH-chee 1920–1985) was an internationally collected Italian figurative artist with the largest group of owners of his works residing in Switzerland, England, Germany, Italy, Canada and the US; as well as various works scattered the world over. Although constantly drawing or painting from childhood to the day he succumbed to lung cancer, Diego's most productive period was the last quarter century of his life which began when he met Helga Drössler in January 1960 in Paris. A significant turning point in Diego's career, Diego said, "My life took on new meaning.  I became more." Helga who became Diego's wife, lover, best friend and confidant, published seven chapters of her life with Diego on Artifact Collectors. Within those 25 abundant years Diego created 4000 oils, mostly on canvas, and many thousands of drawings.

"Each movement had its great masters, but there are very few who could create art unconfined by a single style like Diego." – Christopher Voci

Impressionism, Cubism, Surrealism, and Fauvism all experienced the hand of Diego Voci who was fascinated by the beauty and mystery of the face and figure, whether the female body nude or in ballet, or the etched lines of life's hardships in an old man's face, or the grace and power of the horse.  Diego's versatility was his strength. Diego not only saw and realized human frailty, the desire and longing of the human to be something more, seeking but not to find; but also he understood man's animal instinct to overpower, offset by the object's instinct to resist.

1920–1938: early life
Antonio Diego Voci (VOH-chee), the youngest of 3 brothers was born Antonio Innocenzo Voci on 10 August 1920 in the mountainous region near Catanzaro, Italy, in the small village of Gasperina, to Giuseppantonio Voci and Arcangela Messina Voci, a Catholic family of modest means. From childhood Diego felt compelled to draw as constantly and effortlessly as he drew a breath, endowed by nature to do both.
At an early age Diego took charge of his own life direction.  Diego proudly boasted his independent, I'll-do-it-myself spirit when at age eight, he carved his own religious statue when his father would not buy the one he wanted in a Rome store window. Diego was called on in school for art, design and decoration projects. By age 12 he was awarded a year scholarship to a design school. Diego proudly recalled that in his youth religious artist Antonino Calcagnadoro (1876–1935) let him help paint a church fresco. Diego studied sculpture and painting for three years at Lyce d'Art, followed by studies of Greek and Latin, as well as tailoring.

All three Voci boys were sent to Reggio to study tailoring. In December 1920, four months after Diego's birth, their father took the oldest brother Vincenzo, age 15, to Philadelphia where they both worked as tailors. For 3 ½ years Messina Arcangela raised "Toto", her pet name for Diego, until her husband came back to Gasperina with enough money to open a dry goods store. In 1930, Vincenzo returned to Italy to marry 17-year-old Anna Spadea, (born 1913 Gasperina) whom he took back to Philadelphia continuing as one of the area's finest tailors and designer for Pincus Manufacturing. The middle brother, Giuseppe became a professional musician and played in the Rome Orchestra.

Diego sold his first painting at age 18. Typical of most parents, Giuseppantonio, encouraged his son to follow in his traditional profession, "Toto [Diego], the God of Art does not give bread." But the compulsion in Diego for art was too strong, the pleasure too rewarding, "'I was born to paint." And paint he did in the thousands, and drawings beyond count. In addition to his vast array of artworks, Diego would also design and make his own clothes as an adult, and for the ladies of his liking.

Diego relied on himself for money.  All members of the Voci family agree Diego never received financing from the family, and that he never worked at any occupation other than art. Upon venturing out on his own Diego summoned his practical side to employ his art talent to works of art he knew the public would quickly buy, to raise money or trade for food, bed, paint and canvas, and to finance his study, to expand knowledge, experience and skill. Also to enjoy pleasures in life, and sports.  (Diego was a competitive cyclist in high school.) His time to create his own masterworks would come later.

1939–1948: school and WWII

Art schools and World War II military service in the Italian Army would consume Diego's life through 1948.  At 19 Diego enrolled at the Florence Academy of Arts in San Marco Piazza.  At 20 his art studies were interrupted by World War II.

1945 with the war over, Diego then returned to the Florence Academy of Arts for 3 years studying the classic styles of sculpture and painting of Donatello, Leonardo, Michelangelo and many others.

World War II POW: art was the key to survival
During World War II, Diego was sent to the front lines as an Italian Army soldier to fight against the Germans.  Conditions were horrible.  When he came home on leave Diego's mother Messina Arcangela had to boil her son's uniform to get rid of the lice infestation. On his return Diego was captured and sent to a German Prisoner of War Camp in North Germany. With luck or ingenuity or both, Diego the survivor befriended the German Camp Commander who was so impressed with Diego's artistic talents, he moved Diego to his quarters to live and make paintings and caricatures. Diego enjoyed those privileges until the end of the war. It is generally believed that Diego also befriended an American Officer who was a prisoner in the same camp which led to the important contribution the American Military Community would play in Diego's career providing a reliable source of income.  Diego's works were likely signed "Voci", as it was not until 1965/6 the "Diego" signature was prominently used.

In 1948 Diego moved to Paris to further his education at Ecole des Beaux-Arts. In Paris Diego learned "the real academy is the café, study people, meet so many artists."

Diego thrived on camaraderie, as did other artists before him, such as Amedeo Modigliani, both "figurative" artists, both Italian born, both migrated to Paris. Among Diego's many facets was a drive never to be poor, never to live a tormented drug ridden life of Amedeo Modigliani who at age 35 "died in Paris exacerbated by poverty only one exhibition to his credit." or the tortured life of Vincent van Gogh who died at age 37, with only one painting purchased in his lifetime.  Diego greatly admired the exceptional work of both artists, but, unlike both artists who found few buyers for their work, in their lifetime, Diego did for his.

Diego's influences
Professor Felice Carena (1879–1966), who was one of Italy's great religious artists displayed in Museum of Modern Religious Art in Rome, was a mentor for Diego. Diego in his youth also worked as an assistant to Antonino Calcagnadoro (1876–1935), who was known for his church frescos. Diego admired Renoir, Cézanne, Degas, Modigliani and Van Gogh. There was a reluctance in Diego to pinpoint his early inspiration.  When asked in 1973 Diego said, "Michelangelo is the greatest.  There are so many.  Leonardo da Vinci, Botticelli, Rembrandt.  And Miró, Chagall, Picasso.  So many."

1949–1959 the painter explorer

Venice

The powerful urge was deep in Diego's DNA to explore the world and its people to capture in art all that it offered.  During Diego's extensive travels he said "I was always painting, always learning ...to fill a need to express."

1949 Diego established his home base in Venice, where he would paint, travel and return.  That need to explore the world took Diego to Spain, Portugal, North Africa, Turkey, England and Scandinavia. Canadian Art Dealer, Joy Gibson Naffouj wrote, "Diego displayed his work often...displaying his work in Torino, Capri and Venice.   His first one man show was at the Galleria La Bussula in Torino." In 1951 the city of Venice sponsored a competition, a showcase for Italian artists.  Carlo Carrà (1881–1966) noted figure of the Futurist movement and arguably the most important Italian artist at the time, won first prize.  Diego won second prize. Also, in 1951 Diego had a one-man show in Switzerland and painted for galleries who represented master artists including Rembrandt, Renoir, and Monet. Diego was commissioned to do frescos, sculptures, relief sculptures and canvases by private collections, Italian restaurants, and galleries throughout Europe. After his one-man show in Lugano in 1953, Diego travelled continuously stopping to show in Milano, Rome and Genoa.

First marriage

Also in 1953, Diego met 16-year-old Josiane Schäfer, a ski instructor and daughter of a well-to-do Swiss family, who at 18 would become Mrs. Voci. The Schäfer family owned a mountain cabin for skiing.

Diego travels with nephew

In 1956, Diego moved to Wiesbaden, Germany with his first wife Josiane. Diego's American nephew, Anthony (Tony) Voci, son of Vincenzo, was stationed at Wurzburg U.S. Army Base as a Tank Commander. Tony was impressed that Diego knew the Base Commander and obtained leave time for him. Diego showed Tony the portraits of Officers he was commissioned to do, but said, "That is not art!"

Anthony spent much of his free time touring Germany, Switzerland and Northern Italy with Diego. Tony said, "Anytime there was an espresso sign we stopped.  Everybody knew Diego.  He would sketch the waitress on a napkin and hand it to her.  Diego would paint or sketch nearly every waking minute while traveling together."

It is notable that Anthony Voci is the only known person identified to date that is in possession of any art work by Diego from childhood to 1957. Tony recalls on their travels together through Europe, he said "I'm hungry". Diego stopped and said "You are hungry? I paint you something to eat.", and minutes later gave Tony a memento of his time when his uncle played a joke on him.  Tony, at 80, is living in Philadelphia where this gift from Diego is displayed.

Another day, Diego swiftly completed a gouache of a Paris "Café Scene" as a second gift to his nephew, also dated 1957, and signed "D. Voci", which Tony since gave to his son, Chris Voci. View serious works by Diego in Gallery Section.

1960–1985 life with Helga Drössler Voci

Paris

The 25 years of Diego Voci with Helga Drössler Voci (born in Prague in 1939) were by every standard his best contributing years to the world of art. The following paragraph is excerpted from "HELGA and DIEGO" Chapter Two

Diego Voci and caricatures

Diego was popular in the World War II POW Camp doing caricatures and portraits Connections Diego made with the American prisoners led to Diego's later cash flow source in the American Officer's Clubs that dotted Europe after WWII. Moreover, Diego considered the practice of caricatures that he swiftly and superbly executed to be an excellent study of people and faces, his favorite subjects.

Helga Voci describes her discovery,

Southern Europe and London
Summer of 1960 in Paris, Helga fell ill where she was hospitalized for 3 months with Diego at her side, at which time Diego officially registered as a resident of Paris. Diego took Helga to South France to relax in "very good hotels" for recovery until the holiday season. Helga went to Bavaria to be with her family. Diego went to London to rent a furnished apartment in Soho where Helga joined him in January. Diego painted.

By fall 1961 Diego wanted to escape London weather. They spent until January 1962 in a little fishing village in Spain called Almunecar, an artist's colony. Diego painted, and played cards with fisherman and studied the village people he would portray from memory (example on left). Diego said he never copies.  He creates from his vast library of mental images collected from international travels and mingling with everyday people.

February 1962, their next stop was Morocco and while there Diego received a commission in Marrakesh at the American Officer's Club. Diego traveled throughout Morocco while Helga took a job at a travel agency in Lugano, Switzerland. On the way to meet Helga in Lugano, Diego made arrangements for Globart in Milano to show his paintings. August 1962, Diego joined Helga in Switzerland renting a boathouse on Lake Constance.

Schlossgalerie Zurich

A notable event for Diego in the fall of 1962 was the agreement he made with Schlossgalerie in Zurich under the name "Antonio Voci" (no Diego) to sell his paintings to their wealthy patrons, many of whom were horse aficionados. Schlossgalerie provided Diego a studio.  He signed his works "A. Voci"

Helga Voci said, "The owner [R. Buri] sold quite many paintings." During this time Diego also went to Aviano Air Base to sell paintings and would do caricatures in the Officer's club.

JFK
In 1963, a painting by Diego signed "Voci" was selected by an Air Force Officer from the 526th Tactical Interceptor Squadron (later renamed 526th Tactical Fighter Sq.) and flown from Aviano Air Force Base to Wiesbaden. On the evening of 25 June 1963, the painting was presented to President John F. Kennedy at the General Von Steuben Hotel. The President left Wiesbaden the next morning for Berlin for his famous Ich bin ein Berliner speech.

Return to Italy

Diego longed to leave Switzerland to return to the warmer southern country where he felt more at ease and more inspired to paint. As Victoria Williams wrote in the TV Guide, "Where people gather in groups to talk on the street, play games in the yard, sit in parks, lovers, strangers, the poor, the rich, mothers, fathers, children, happy people, sad people.  These are the subjects of Diego."

Helga Voci wrote,

Germany – Naffouj and Dahms galleries
The sequence of four women entering Diego's life and the impact on Diego's success cannot be overestimated.  First, 1960 was Helga for 25 years. Then, in 1965 Joy Gibson, a Canadian art dealer opened a location in Zweibrucken, Germany between the Canadian and the American Air Force bases. As Diego's agent for seven years, she with assistance of Jawdat Naffouj who became her husband, opened Naffouj Gallery in Landstuhl which Jawdat still runs today. The Naffouj's introduced the iconic Diego signature which dominated Diego works for the next two decades. They turned art buyers into devoted Diego collectors throughout Germany, USA and Canada; they also published eight Diego lithographs. In 1972, Lillian Dussard who worked for Naffouj Gallery, became Diego's agent to the Department of Defense locations until she went to US and opened her own gallery in Stafford, Virginia. In 1974 Christine Kahn took over the agent responsibilities for Diego for the next decade. All 3 women worked closely with Helga. Christine and Helga's friendship continues into present time.

Diego ceased working with Schlossgalerie when Helga and Diego moved in 1965 to Wiesbaden, Germany. Diego continued to take trips to Italy where he received a commission from Alfa Romeo in 1966. He also made a connection with the luxurious Galerie Dahms located on the prestigious Wilhelmstrasse of Wiesbaden that would last for many years.

Owner Siegfred Dahms wrote,

NOTE: A very large Diego painting is known to have been sold in 1978 by Herr Dahms for DM 15,000.

In 1965, Diego leased an apartment for five years in Wiesbaden. Diego also made a 5-year agreement with Naffouj Gallery in Landstuhl for so many paintings for so much per month. Joy Naffouj said, "To watch Diego paint is magical.  His hand moves so fast it is blurred to the eye."

Helga wrote:

After five years, in 1970, recognizing Diego's significant talent, Jawdat Naffouj wanted assurance for future Diego artwork so a written guarantee contract went into effect signed, "Antonio Diego", this is the only evidence of the name Diego in a document signature from birth until 1976 when he registered in Taunusstein. In March 1970, to prepare for a one-man exhibit in Ravenna, Italy at Galleria Cairoli in October, Diego and Helga rented a villa enjoying the Italian lifestyle along the Adrian Sea in Riccione, while still mailing paintings to Naffouj Gallery.

After the exhibit, Diego and Helga headed to Bavaria, Germany to assist Helga's parents with the interior design of their newly constructed home where art by Diego remains today; sculpted fireplace and sculpted copper front door. They stayed and rented an apartment from late 1970 until mid-1972. In 1971, the University of Wisconsin received two Diego paintings from the Norman Marohn collection for the Polk Library. In 1972, Schwetzingen, Germany became their home.  There Diego and Helga had a daughter, Alessandra, cared for by a nanny from India who stayed with them until 1985. Diego ended his guarantee-of-exclusivity contract with Naffouj Gallery in 1972 and continue travelling exhibitions with Lillian Dussard assisting.  A sales relationship continued with Naffouj until 1979 and with Galerie Dahms until 1985.

Exhibitions in the US

Diego and Helga's first trip to the US was in 1973. Diego was asked to come to Colorado for an exhibition by Dr. Ogden Brown, an avid Diego collector that he met in Germany.

The Voci's, who had no knowledge of credit cards, bought a used station-wagon with cash on the east coast to travel cross country.
A solo show of Diego's work was successfully presented in November 1973, by Dr. Brown's daughter Marsha Largent at the Broadmoor Hotel in Colorado Springs.
The travels throughout the US expanded Diego's versatility in compositions. Diego was deeply moved by the Native American Indian in New Mexico which he translated to drawings and canvases.

In the news

In 1973/4 the introduction of writer, Victoria Williams, and John Krueger, a writer for Stars & Stripes newspaper through Diego collector Coop Cooprider, widened Diego's audience.

This included a live AFN TV interview on Women's World (while Diego was creating sketches), a published article in AFNTV guide, an 8-page glossy catalog capturing some of the Diego's masterworks, advertisements in Art News and an article by Walter Trott in Stars and Stripes. Although Coop's volunteer working relationship ended in mid-1974, he and wife Patti continued to add to their Diego collection and kept in contact for several years later.

The final decade
The last 10 years of Diego's life, his representation grew widespread from Galerie Dahms in Wiesbaden, Naffouj Gallery in Landstuhl, to Talbert's Gallery, Washington, US, and Glen Burnie Gallery, Maryland, US.  In addition, in Canada exhibitions for Diego in 1981 were held at Goldcrest Galleries, Toronto; Stephen Max, Alberta; and the Van Zoolingen Gallery in Edmonton.  And others such as, Salon Panetta in Manheim, Germany, with Gallerist Fausto Panetta (Rome region native), where over 20 Diegos sold in one exhibition.

As Diego's acclaim grew, he ventured into publishing another series of prints handmade on special lithostones in Urbino Italy in 1979, financed by Naffouj Gallery.

In the last 10 years the faces by Diego became less rugged, more refined and elongated. What never changed in Diego's art was his trust in human character.  In painting after painting the presence of the human face and figure revealed Diego's vision of the world.

During a second visit to the United States in 1980 accompanied by their daughter Alessandra, Diego and Helga visited with his brother, Vincenzo in Philadelphia. Travels included New York and then headed west stopping in Tacoma, Washington where Diego had an exhibit at Talbert's Kleine Gallery, and Inga Fine Arts in addition to Good Years Gallery in Seattle. Their travels brought them to San Francisco, Albuquerque, Colorado Springs and New Orleans visiting American friends they had met in Germany and held private exhibits along the way.

During their last trip to the US in 1984, travels included a family visit in Philadelphia, a drive back to Albuquerque refreshing Diego's fascination of American Indians, and Colorado Springs to visit with devoted Diego art collectors. Diego did no exhibits during this trip.  A holiday was taken in August 1985 to Menorca, Spain. In fall of 1985 Diego experienced health issues.  Then on the trip to Paris with Tony (Diego's Nephew) and Lois Voci, Diego mainly stayed in the hotel room resting.

Diego's last hours

That persistent urge to draw that possessed Diego from a young child carried into Diego's last hours. The second weekend of December there was an open house in Diego's home and studio; he was too weak to attend. Yet he found the strength to draw one more piece for a door prize, his last work of art for the public, a cubist, ink drawing; followed by a small pencil sketch for Helga.

Diego, who smoked 40 cigarettes a day, succumbed to lung cancer 10 December 1985.

The resting place for Diego Voci is in Neuhof, Germany. On Helga's periodic visits she shares her thoughts with both Diego and her mother beside him.

Rediscovering lost art of Antonio Diego Voci
The mystery is what happened to all of Diego's early artwork?
With his vagabond nature, Diego was notoriously a poor record keeper. Although early examples of Diego Voci artwork are out there somewhere, Diego's first sale at age 18, and all works until 1957 remain totally undiscovered. Search for physical evidence of his art continues. Until 1965, the signatures are all likely a form of "Voci", not "Diego" as mostly on works after 1965. (See comments on the signatures of Antonio Diego Voci in a following section.)

Problem of hoarding
Diego's death was followed by a twenty-five-year vacuum of information. An Internet search made by a seeker of anything about Diego Voci would come up empty. Diego was mostly unknown in the broader art world beyond his dedicated band of devoted collectors who each bought several pieces and basically "hoarded" his work. Puzzled, an owner of 5 Diego pieces, Mary Trimmins in 2008 posted a simple question on ArtifactCollectors.com, "Are there any Diego painting owners out there?" Little by little Diego owners discovered Trimmins post.

About 50 collectors responded owning collectively over 400 Diego art pieces. The significant common denominator was that collectors bought, kept and treasured all their Diegos' for 35 to 45 years, displaying them and enjoying them. Result Diego's art did not appear on the market. But, time is ruthless.  Diego collectors are in their senior years and many no longer grace this earth.  The result is smatterings of Diego's art have been appearing in various countries on the market in Germany, Switzerland, USA and Canada.

Search on Internet sites established
In 2009, inspired by the positive response of Diego collectors' to Trimmins question, Diego's grand nephew Christopher Voci in Philadelphia created www.diegovociproject.com with a mission to "Rediscover Lost Art of Antonio Diego Voci". A Diego collector in California also volunteered to assist in the search for lost Diego artwork establishing sites on Facebook (Diego Voci), Twitter (@DiegoVoci). Also on Artifact Collectors, (to supplement the Trimmin's thread) "Diego Voci History" and "Diego Voci Painting of the Week".

After a quarter century vacuum of information the collaborative internet search for the thousands of undiscovered works by Diego Voci is gradually yielding collectors in various countries. Fifteen of the more avid collectors identified each had a dozen or more works by Diego. One self-confessed Diego "hoarder" referred to his "addiction" for collecting Diego's artwork as the "Potato Chip Phenomenon", you can't stop at only one. Siegfred Dahms, Wiesbaden art dealer expressed a similar experience.

Switzerland: two works discovered

The earliest physical evidence found to date of a purchase of Diego art work is two larger beautifully rendered paintings sold by the Schlossgalarie, in Zurich, Switzerland. Owner R. Buri considered these two paintings to be "Antonio Voci" masterworks. His wealthy clients often sought exceptional horse paintings. The 1962/3 "Horses Racing", was described by Mr. Buri as a "Voci masterpiece with hints of a fine Edgar Degas."

Just as Diego travelled the world, so too did his art. "Horses Racing" went to auction in Paris where it was purchased by an antique dealer from Basel. It was then purchased by a Czech born grand-dame as a wedding gift to her new son-in-law, who came from a family of race horse breeders in India. When contacted about his Diego in London where he resides, the son-in-law declared, "You call it a Diego, I consider it a Voci". And it is signed "A. Voci". Schlossgalerie advertised the artist under the name "Antonio Voci" (No "Diego").

Also signed "A. Voci" is another significant Diego piece "Alt und Yung" pictured in the Schlossgalerie advertisement of the Neue Zurcher Zeitung 20 January 1965. This painting also travelled, purchased in Zurich and ending in US, 43 years later.

A colour image of Diego's "Alt und Yung" painting can also be seen in a 2008 rare internet recorded sale on LiveAuctioneers.com. Kodner Auctions mis-titled the painting "Horses Grazing". In the absence of information about the artist, the painting was sold for a fraction of its original selling price.  Later, a Diego collector offered to triple the price (or more), but requests to Kodner to reveal the present whereabouts were rejected.

Innocenzo v. Diego
"Diego" as he wanted the world to know him, rejected his birth middle name "Innocenzo". Being the youngest of three boys by fifteen years, that sweet little newborn was the picture of innocence (Italian: innocenza).  Diego wanted to be seen as anything but innocent. The family pet childhood name "Toto" was enough to bear. "Diego told me he never liked his middle name," said Helga Drössler Voci, wife. "Innocenzo" is conspicuous by its official document absence in Diego's life. Innocenzo was discovered only on his birth certificate. After that it is "Antonio Voci" until 1976 when "Diego" is slipped into a government document.

Gallery
Works

Faces

Surrealism

Cubism

Clowns, Harlequins, and Musicians

Landscapes

Horses/Boats

Signatures

References

External links

  Scanned Documents
  Diego Voci Website
  Diego Voci History at Artifact Collectors  
  Diego Voci at Artifact Collectors Main Thread DV-ADV
  Diego Voci Artifact Collectors Painting of the Week

1920 births
1985 deaths
Impressionism
Fauvism
20th-century Italian painters
20th-century Italian male artists
Italian male painters
Modern painters
Italian expatriates in France